Barney Koneferenisi (born 9 March 1994) is a wheelchair rugby player from New Zealand, and a member of the national team, the Wheel Blacks. Koneferenisi won the 2013 NWRC GIO Most Trusted Player award, and appeared on New Zealand television programme Attitude.

References

External links
 

1994 births
Living people
New Zealand wheelchair rugby players
Paralympic wheelchair rugby players of New Zealand
Wheelchair rugby players at the 2020 Summer Paralympics